Clive Stafford (born 4 April 1963) is an English former professional footballer.

Career
Born in Ipswich, Stafford joined local amateur club Coplestonians in his teens, where he spent eight years, before joining Achilles in 1985. Three years later he signed for Diss Town. Working in the insurance industry at the time, following trials with Ipswich Town in January 1989, he turned professional after signing for Colchester United on 5 March. However, after just over a year at Colchester, including a loan spell at Exeter City and a trial at West Brom, he returned to non-League football with Bury Town.

In 1992, he signed for Sudbury Town, where he played alongside several other ex-Colchester players in a team that reached the first round of the FA Cup for the first time in the club's history. In 1998, he joined Felixstowe Port & Town, ending his playing career at the end of the season.

Stafford later served as reserve team manager at Woodbridge Town, and currently coaches at Coplestonians. He has also appeared in friendly matches for Suffolk County Cricket Club.

References

1963 births
Sportspeople from Ipswich
English footballers
Achilles F.C. players
Diss Town F.C. players
Colchester United F.C. players
Exeter City F.C. players
Bury Town F.C. players
Sudbury Town F.C. players
Felixstowe & Walton United F.C. players
Living people
Association football defenders